The St. Petersburg Open Invitational, first played as the St. Petersburg Open, was a PGA Tour event that was held at three St. Petersburg, Florida area clubs for 29 years from 1930 until 1964. The clubs that hosted the event were: Lakewood Country Club (now known as St. Petersburg Country Club), Pasadena Country Club (now known as Pasadena Yacht and Country Club), and Sunset Golf Club of the Vinoy Park Hotel (now known as the Renaissance Vinoy Resort & Golf Club).

Bob Goalby won the 1961 event after making eight consecutive birdies in the final round, a PGA Tour record at the time. Other golfers tied Goalby's mark but nobody surpassed it till 2009. In 1963, Raymond Floyd won the event at 20 years 6 months of age becoming the youngest player to win a PGA Tour event since 1928.

Bruce Devlin, an Australian golfer who had recently moved to the United States, won the first of his eight PGA Tour titles at the last one in 1964. The tournament succumbed to financial pressure when the St. Petersburg City Council voted to postpone a decision on sponsorship of the 1965 event, and then Jacksonville announced the resumption of the Jacksonville Open during week the tournament was to be held.

Tournament hosts

Winners

References

Former PGA Tour events
Golf in Florida
Sports competitions in St. Petersburg, Florida
Recurring sporting events established in 1930
Recurring sporting events disestablished in 1964
1930 establishments in Florida
1964 disestablishments in Florida